Cotabato Airport, also known as Awang Airport , is an airport serving the general area of Cotabato City, North Cotabato and Maguindanao del Norte and Maguindanao del Sur, located in the province of Maguindanao del Norte in the Philippines. It is classified as a Class 1 principal (major domestic) airport by the Civil Aviation Authority of the Philippines, a body of the Department of Transportation that is responsible for the operations of all airports in the Philippines except the major international airports.

The airport is the 21st busiest airport in the Philippines in 2021. The airport is generally used by the people of Cotabato City.

Airlines and destinations

Statistics 

Data from Civil Aviation Authority of the Philippines (CAAP).

Passenger movements

Future plans

Potential Destinations 
According to the recent interview with Atty. Sinarimbo in Midsayap Radio Program, they are already preparing to open flights and shipping route from Cotabato City to (Basilan, Sulu, Tawi-tawi) BASULTA. This will fasten the government services that will directly link connectivity of Bangsamoro to island Provinces. At present time cargo or passengers movement are via Zamboanga or Manila Airport and Seaport respectively. Soon this will utilize the Polloc International Seaport and Cotabato Airport capabilities.

Night flights and Infrastructure Upgrades 
According to the Department of Transportation (DOTr), airports in the city of Cotabato is now undergoing rehabilitation and expansion.

The repairs include the widening of the breath of the runway and the upgrade of terminal facilities for night-flight capabilities. On 18 June 2021, runway strip grade correction work began, conducted by DOTr, Department of National Defense (DND) and the 549th Engineering Brigade of the Philippine Army. Construction work is expected to finish within 450 days.

International airport 
An International Airport is proposed to be built to Barangay Tamontaka, Cotabato City, while the existing domestic airport will serve as a Military Air Base. As of now, construction is anticipated in June 2019.

See also
List of airports in the Philippines

References

External links

World Aero Data - Cotabato Airport (CBO) Details

Airports in the Philippines
Buildings and structures in Maguindanao del Norte
Transportation in Mindanao